Grevillea levis is a species of flowering plant in the family Proteaceae and is endemic to the west of Western Australia. It is a dense shrub with divided leaves, the end lobes linear and sharply pointed, and clusters of white to cream-coloured flowers, sometimes flushed with pink.

Description
The flowers are arranged in more or less spherical or domed clusters on a glabrous rachis.

Taxonomy
Grevillea levis was first formally described in 1994 by Peter M. Olde and Neil R. Marriott in The Grevillea Book, from specimens collected by Olde near Mount Churchman (near Karroun Hill Nature Reserve) in 1991. The specific epithet (levis) means "smooth", referring to the fruit.

Distribution and habitat
This grevillea grows in heath or shrubland between the lower Murchison River, Coorow and Dalwallinu and inland to Bullfinch and Coolgardie, in the Avon Wheatbelt, Coolgardie, Geraldton Sandplains, Murchison and Yalgoo bioregions of western Western Australia.

Conservation status
Grevillea levis is listed as "not threatened" by the Department of Biodiversity, Conservation and Attractions.

References

levis
Eudicots of Western Australia
Proteales of Australia
Plants described in 1994